Guichard's rock gecko (Pristurus guichardi) is a species of lizard in the Sphaerodactylidae family found on Socotra Island.

References

Pristurus
Reptiles described in 1986